The Civil Administrator of Mount Athos is the civil head of government of the territory of the monastic community of Mount Athos, an autonomous region in northern Greece. His seat is Karyes, Mount Athos. There are several other offices established in Thessaloniki and Ouranoupoli. Since  3 September 2019, the incumbent Civil Administrator is the businessman and Archon Offikialios of the Ecumenical Patriarchate of Constantinople, Athanasios Martinos.

Per Greek law, the civil government of Mount Athos falls under the jurisdiction of the Ministry of Foreign Affairs of Greece, with the Civil Administration of Mount Athos being responsible for exercising it locally. According to article 29 of the charter of the Ministry of Foreign Affairs, the Civil Administration of Mount Athos consists of the Civil Administrator of Mount Athos (similar to a regional governor in the rest of Greece), the Deputy Civil Administrator and the rest of their staff, permanent or not.

List of Civil Administrators of Mount Athos

References

Mount Athos
Ministry of Foreign Affairs (Greece)
Lists of political office-holders in Greece